In Major League Baseball, the general manager (GM) of a team typically controls player transactions and bears the primary responsibility on behalf of the ballclub during contract discussions with players.

Roles and responsibilities
The general manager is normally the person who hires and fires the coaching staff, including the field manager who acts as the head coach.  In baseball, the term manager used without qualification almost always refers to the field manager, not the general manager.

Before the 1960s, and in some rare cases since then, a person with the general manager title in sports has also borne responsibility for the non-player operations of the ballclub, such as ballpark administration and broadcasting.  Ed Barrow, George Weiss and Gabe Paul were three baseball GMs noted for their administrative skills in both player and non-player duties.

History and evolution
In the first decades of baseball's post-1901 modern era, responsibilities for player acquisition fell upon the club owner and/or president and the field manager. In some cases, particularly in the early years of the American League, the owner was a former player or manager himself: Charles Comiskey of the Chicago White Sox, Connie Mack of the Philadelphia Athletics, and Clark Griffith of the Washington Senators are three prominent examples. Other owners tended to be magnates from the business world, or some, like Brooklyn Dodgers' president Charles Ebbets, worked their way from front-office jobs into ownership positions. Most deferred player personnel evaluations to their on-field managers. One notable exception, cited by Mark L. Armour and Daniel R. Leavitt in their book In Pursuit of Pennants, was German immigrant Barney Dreyfuss, owner of the Pittsburgh Pirates from 1900–1932. Dreyfuss had no playing background, but was one of the most astute judges of talent of his time; under him, Pittsburgh won six National League pennants and two World Series titles. The New York Giants' John McGraw, who also held a minority ownership stake in the team, is an example of a powerful manager who, during his three decades at the Giants' helm, exerted control over off-field aspects of the team's operation.

According to Baseball Almanac, the first man to hold the title of general manager was Billy Evans when he was appointed by the Cleveland Indians in 1927. However, the duties of the modern general manager already had been assumed by two executives — Barrow of the New York Yankees and Branch Rickey of the St. Louis Cardinals — whose formal title at the time was business manager. Both were former field managers of big-league teams, although Barrow had no professional playing background.

They assumed those positions (Barrow in 1920 and Rickey five years later) when clubs could legally control only 15 minor league players on option, and most young players were purchased or drafted from independently owned minor league teams. Rickey, creator of the modern and extensive farm system during the 1920s and 1930s, played a critical role in inventing the need for a general manager as well: with most teams coming to own or affiliate with multiple minor league teams from Class D to the top tier, and with dozens (and in some cases hundreds) of players under contract, they needed a front-office infrastructure to oversee the major league club, scouting and player procurement, minor league operations and player development, and business affairs. The general manager, in lieu of the "owner-operator", provided that oversight.

But both the owner-operator and the field-manager-as-GM models would survive into the 1980s. Owners Charlie Finley of the Oakland Athletics and Calvin Griffith of the Minnesota Twins functioned as their own chiefs of baseball operations. During the 1970s and 1980s, Alvin Dark of the Cleveland Indians, Billy Martin of the Athletics (after Finley sold them in 1981), and Whitey Herzog of the Cardinals combined manager and general manager duties, while Paul Owens of the Philadelphia Phillies and Jack McKeon of the San Diego Padres were general managers who appointed themselves field managers and held both posts.

Trend towards "presidents of baseball operations"
During the second decade of the 21st century, a trend began in Major League Baseball that saw the creation of a new layer of authority between ownership and the general manager, almost always termed the President of Baseball Operations. In some cases, these "POBOs" work in concert with others in the organization styled as presidents, but with non-baseball-centric responsibilities, like President/CEO or /COO. Writing for Sports Business Daily in March 2015, legal academic and sports lawyer Glenn M. Wong observed: "No longer is it always true that the GM is the final decision-maker with respect to baseball decisions." Larry Beinfest of the Florida Marlins was the first to hold the POBO title, in 2007. One of the reasons for the creation of this new position cited by SBD in 2015 is the soaring costs and revenues associated with modern MLB operations. "Ownership is often heavily involved in major investments and decisions ... Installing another layer creates a sort of checks-and-balances system and a checkpoint for the decision-making process."

Three months later, another article by Wong published in the Sports Business Daily revisited the topic and compared the evolving job descriptions and career trajectories of general managers and POBOs.  In 2016, SBD writer Eric Fisher cited the growing importance of data analytics in playing personnel evaluations and long-term planning (in addition to in game strategy), and heavier investments in player development, domestically and internationally, as contributing to the POBO movement and other structural changes in baseball front offices.

The 2019 Baseball America Annual Directory listed 12 presidents of baseball operations among the 30 MLB teams, as well as one "chief baseball officer" and four "executive vice presidents of baseball operations" operating above the general manager level or also holding the GM title.

See also

Sporting News Executive of the Decade (2009)
Sports Illustrated Best GM of the Decade (2009)
Sports Illustrated Top 10 GMs/Executives of the Decade (in all sports) (2009)
"Esurance MLB Awards" Best Executive
Sporting News Executive of the Year
Baseball America Major League Executive of the Year
Baseball America Roland Hemond Award (for long-term contributions to scouting and player development)
Baseball America Lifetime Achievement Award
Honor Rolls of Baseball#Executives
Sports Illustrated Best Franchise of the Decade (2009)
Sports Illustrated Top 25 Franchises of the Decade (in all sports) (2009)
Baseball America Organization of the Year
MiLB "Rawlings Woman Executive of the Year" award (Baseball awards#U.S. minor leagues)
Baseball America Minor League Executive of the Year
Baseball America Bob Freitas Awards (for outstanding minor-league operations at Triple-A, Double-A, Class A, and short-season)
Baseball America Independent Organization of the Year

References

External links

American League
Baltimore Orioles Front Office
Boston Red Sox Front Office
Chicago White Sox Front Office
Cleveland Indians Front Office
Detroit Tigers Front Office
Houston Astros Front Office
Kansas City Royals Front Office
Los Angeles Angels of Anaheim Front Office
Minnesota Twins Front Office
New York Yankees Front Office

Oakland Athletics Front Office
Seattle Mariners Front Office
Tampa Bay Rays Front Office
Texas Rangers Front Office
Toronto Blue Jays Front Office

National League
Arizona Diamondbacks Front Office
Atlanta Braves Front Office
Chicago Cubs Front Office
Cincinnati Reds Front Office
Colorado Rockies Front Office

Los Angeles Dodgers Front Office
Miami Marlins Front Office
Milwaukee Brewers Front Office
New York Mets Front Office
Philadelphia Phillies Front Office
Pittsburgh Pirates Front Office
San Diego Padres Front Office
San Francisco Giants Front Office
St. Louis Cardinals Front Office
Washington Nationals Front Office

Baseball occupations